Hibbertia grossulariifolia is a species of flowering plant in the family Dilleniaceae and is endemic to the south-west of Western Australia.

The species was first formally described in 1807 by English botanist Richard Salisbury and was given the name Burtonia grossulariaefolia in The Paradisus Londinensis. Later in the same year, Salisbury changed the name to Hibbertia grossulariifolia. The specific epithet (grossulariifolia) means "Grossularia-leaved".

References

grossulariifolia
Eudicots of Western Australia
Plants described in 1807
Taxa named by Richard Anthony Salisbury